Estelle Harrison was a silent actress during Hollywood's silent era. She primarily appeared in Gaylord Lloyd and Harold Lloyd shorts.

Biography 
Estelle was born Florence, Alabama, to Willis Harrison and Kate Hudson. When Estelle was young, the family moved to Los Angeles, where she and her siblings attended school.

Selected filmography 

 Fighting Hearts (1922)
 A Knight of the West (1921)
 Dodge Your Debts (1921)
 A Zero Hero (1921)
 The Lucky Number (1921)
 His Jonah Day (1920) 
 A Jazzed Honeymoon (1919) 
 Pistols for Breakfast (1919) 
 Si, Senor (1919) 
 Ring Up the Curtain (1919)
 Just Dropped In (1919)
 She Loves Me Not (1918)
 No Place Like Jail (1918)
 Kicking the Germ Out of Germany (1918) 
 It's a Wild Life (1918) 
 Follow the Crowd (1918)
 On the Jump (1918) 
 Here Come the Girls (1918) 
 We Never Sleep (1917) 
 Lonesome Luke Loses Patients (1917) 
 Lonesome Luke's Wild Women (1917) 
 Lonesome Luke, Mechanic (1917) 
 Lonesome Luke's Honeymoon (1917) 
 Luke Wins Ye Ladye Faire (1917) 
 Lonesome Luke, Lawyer (1917)
 Luke's Movie Muddle (1916)
 Luke, Patient Provider'' (1916)

References 

Actresses from Alabama
People from Florence, Alabama
1894 births
American film actresses
Year of death missing